"You Owe Me" is a 1999 single by Nas featuring Ginuwine, from Nas' fourth studio album Nastradamus. The single was produced by Timbaland. "You Owe Me" was a hit on the Billboard Hot R&B/Hip-Hop Songs chart, peaking at number thirteen, and it was also a minor hit on the Billboard Hot 100 chart, peaking at number 59. A music video directed by David Meyers was also released; it had a cameo featuring Destiny's Child & DMX.  
The song has been referenced by Jay-Z in "Blueprint 2", and also by J. Cole in his track "Let Nas Down".

Charts

Weekly charts

Year-end charts

References

External links
 

2000 singles
Ginuwine songs
Music videos directed by Dave Meyers (director)
Nas songs
Song recordings produced by Timbaland
Songs written by Static Major
Songs written by Timbaland
Songs written by Nas
1999 songs
Columbia Records singles